GFN may refer to:

GFN, the IATA code for Clarence Valley Regional Airport, an airport in Grafton, New South Wales, Australia
GFN, the National Rail code for Giffnock railway station, East Renfrewshire, Scotland
NVIDIA's GeForce Now service for cloud gaming.